Giedraitis is a Lithuanian language family name. The Polish-language version is Giedroyć.

The surname may refer to:
Giedraitis family, noble family in Polish-Lithuanian Commonwealth
 Andrius Giedraitis (born 1973), Lithuanian basketball player
Merkelis Giedraitis (1536–1609), bishop of Samogitia 
Robertas Giedraitis (born 1970), Lithuanian basketball player and coach
Rokas Giedraitis (born 1992), Lithuanian basketball player 
 Romualdas Giedraitis (1750), Lithuanian military commander, namesake of General Romualdas Giedraitis Artillery Battalion

 
Lithuanian-language surnames